Josef the Chaste (German:Der keusche Josef) may refer to:

 Josef the Chaste (1930 film), directed by Georg Jacoby 
 Josef the Chaste (1953 film), directed by Carl Boese